This is a list of Pakistani Test cricketers. A Test match is an international cricket match between two of the leading cricketing nations. The list is arranged in the order in which each player won his Test cap. Where more than one player won his first Test cap in the same Test match, those players are listed alphabetically by surname.

Players
Statistics are correct as of 6 January 2023.

Shirt number history
Since the 2019 Ashes series, there has been an introduction of names and numbers on all Test players' shirts in an effort to engage new fans and help identify the players. This forms part of the inaugural ICC World Test Championship, a league competition between the top nine Test nations spread over a two-year period, culminating in a Final between the top two teams.

^not worn on kit

See also

 Test cricket
 Pakistani cricket team
 List of Pakistan ODI cricketers
 List of Pakistan Twenty20 International cricketers

Notes

References

External links 

 Cricinfo
 Howstat

Pakistan Test
Test